The Basnahira cricket team, based in Colombo and representing Western Province, was one of the seven Sri Lankan provincial cricket teams that took part in the Inter-Provincial Cricket tournaments. The team drew players from the Sri Lanka Premier Trophy, and their team colours were green and blue. Basnahira took part in all three provincial tournaments: the first-class cricket competition known as the Inter-Provincial First Class Tournament, the List A competition known as the Inter-Provincial Limited Over Tournament and the Twenty20 competition known as the Inter-Provincial Twenty20. As Western Province has the best infrastructure sometimes the team was divided into two teams: Basnahira North and Basnahira South.

History
From the early years of the Inter-Provincial tournament to the 2004/05 season the teams used English names, but from 2007/08 onwards the teams were named in Sinhalese. From its inception of the tournament Western Province presented more than one team to the tournament except for 2003/04 and 2004/05 seasons. Since then Western province teams became known as Basnahira North and Basnahira South (Basnahira is Sinhalese for West). The number of teams representing Western province varied from season to season, as did their names. In 2011 Basnahira North and South teams became Basnahira. Teams represented Western province for the each tournament given below.

Players

Notable players

Honours

Domestic

Twenty20
Inter-Provincial Twenty20: 0

References

Former senior cricket clubs of Sri Lanka